Wilton Township is located in Will County, Illinois. As of the 2010 census, its population was 841 and it contained 318 housing units.

Geography
The Unincorporated communities of Wallingford, Wilton, and Wilton Center are located in the township. The former settlement of Pierce was also located in Wilton Township. Major roads are Wilmington-Peotone Rd, U.S. Route 52, Elevator Rd, Tulley Rd, and Cedar Rd.

Demographics

School
Wilton Township does not have its own school district.  It is a part of Peotone Community School District 207 - U.

References

External links
Wilton Township Official Site
City-data.com
Will County Official Site
Illinois State Archives

Townships in Will County, Illinois
Townships in Illinois
1849 establishments in Illinois